The following highways are numbered 826:

United States